Sweet Things is the 1966 third album with the Blue Flames by Georgie Fame which reached No.6 in the album Top Ten in the UK. Following this album his band The Blue Flames was replaced with The Tornados.

The album, issued on the Columbia label (SX 6043), has been described as "one of the finest British R&B albums of the mid-'60s."

Style and content
Reviewing the album for AllMusic, Dave Thompson says that it ".. follows in the footsteps of its predecessors, a punchy R&B stomper that could (even should) have been recorded live, so high is the energy, and so abandoned the backing of the Blue Flames."

Track listing

Personnel
Source:
Georgie Fame – Hammond organ, vocals
Colin Green – guitar
Glenn Hughes – baritone saxophone
Peter Coe – alto saxophone
Eddie "Tan Tan" Thornton – trumpet
Cliff Barton – bass
John "Mitch" Mitchell – drums
Neemoi "Speedy" Acquaye – "African" percussion

References

External links
 Sweet Things at allmusic.com
 

Georgie Fame albums
1966 albums
Albums produced by Denny Cordell
Columbia Records albums